Kittipong Wachiramanowong (born 25 January 1990) is an inactive professional tennis player from Thailand.

2009
Wachiramanowong received a wildcard for the PTT Thailand Open. He drew eighth seeded and World No. 56 John Isner, and he led a 5 games to 4 in the third set and served for the match. Wachiramanowong eventually lost 3–6, 6–3, 6–7(2).

ATP career finals

Doubles: 1 (0–1)

External links 
 
 

1990 births
Living people
Kittipong Wachiramanowong
Tennis players at the 2010 Asian Games
Kittipong Wachiramanowong
Kittipong Wachiramanowong
Kittipong Wachiramanowong
Kittipong Wachiramanowong
Southeast Asian Games medalists in tennis
Competitors at the 2009 Southeast Asian Games
Competitors at the 2011 Southeast Asian Games
Competitors at the 2015 Southeast Asian Games
Competitors at the 2017 Southeast Asian Games
Kittipong Wachiramanowong